Nercillac is a commune in the Charente department in southwestern France.

History
Pot shards and tegulae in Varaize near the edge of Soloire are signs of Gallo-Roman populations. Le Cluniac priory of Notre Dame located in Montour was founded in the eleventh century by the lords of Cognac and redesigned in the fifteenth century. It has been the object of pilgrimages until the Revolution, when it was sold to an individual. It was destroyed in the twentieth century. The lords lived in the home of Tignoux. Count Nercillac emigrated and returned after the restoration.

Population

Gallery

See also
Communes of the Charente department

References

Communes of Charente
Charente communes articles needing translation from French Wikipedia